In Greek mythology, Thyia (Thuia derived from the verb θύω "to sacrifice") was a Phthian princess as the daughter of King Deucalion of Thessaly.

Biography 
Thyia's mother was Pyrrha, daughter of Epimetheus and Pandora. She was the sister of Hellen and Pandora II, and possibly of Amphictyon, Protogeneia, Melantho (Melanthea) and Candybus.

Like her other sisters, Thyia bore to Zeus sons namely, Magnes and Makednos (the claimed ancestor of the Macedonians). Her account was according to a quotation from Hesiod's lost work the Catalogue of Women, preserved in the De Thematibus of Constantine Porphyrogenitus and in Stephanus of Byzantium's Ethnika.

Notes

References 
 Hesiod, Catalogue of Women from Homeric Hymns, Epic Cycle, Homerica translated by Evelyn-White, H G. Loeb Classical Library Volume 57. London: William Heinemann, 1914. Online version at theio.com
 Stephanus of Byzantium, Stephani Byzantii Ethnicorum quae supersunt, edited by August Meineike (1790-1870), published 1849. A few entries from this important ancient handbook of place names have been translated by Brady Kiesling. Online version at the Topos Text Project.

Princesses in Greek mythology
Thessalian characters in Greek mythology

Thessalian mythology